Michael Leslie Gibbons (January 23, 1951 - November 29, 2005) was an American football player. He played college football for Southwestern Oklahoma State and professional football in the World Football League in 1974 for the Memphis Southmen in 1974 and in the National Football League (NFL) for the New York Giants during the 1976 and 1977 seasons. He appeared in 16 NFL games, six of them as a starter.

References

1951 births
2005 deaths
American football tackles
Memphis Southmen players
New York Giants players
Southwestern Oklahoma State Bulldogs football players
Players of American football from Oklahoma
People from Duncan, Oklahoma